SS Alert was a steamship that sank off Cape Schanck, Victoria, Australia on 28 December 1893.

After Alert sank the ship laid for 113 years on the ocean floor until being rediscovered in June 2007 by a team from Southern Ocean Exploration.

History

Alert was built at Port Glasgow in 1877 and later sailed to Australia as a three-masted schooner with her funnel and propeller stowed in the hold.

During a gale, the ship set out from Lakes Entrance bound for Melbourne via Port Albert. She encountered hurricane-force southerly winds and mountainous seas and sank about four miles off Cape Schanck. Of the 16 people on board, the only survivor was Robert Ponting, the ship's cook, who was washed ashore at Sorrento"back" (ocean) beach after clinging to a portion of cabin door. He was found and revived by locals using brandy and the body heat of a St. Bernard dog.  Two bodies were also washed ashore at Sorrento back beach.

An inquiry was held and attached no blame to the lighthouse keeper or the captain but, after years of litigation, compensation was awarded to Ponting and the wife of one of the deceased.

References

External links
State Library of Victoria: "The Foundering of the S.S. Alert Vic." (illustrations)
The Age Newspaper: "A Scottish secret surfaces" 12 June 2007 (contains illustration of Alert in Storm)
 

Victorian-era merchant ships of Australia
Shipwrecks of Victoria (Australia)
History of Victoria (Australia)
Maritime incidents in 1893
1893 in Australia
Ships built on the River Clyde
1877 ships
Iron and steel steamships of Australia
Australian Shipwrecks with protected zone